Trivial Pursuit: Unhinged is a video game developed by Artech Studios and published by Atari Interactive based on the trivia board game of the same name. It was released in 2004 for the PlayStation 2, Xbox and Microsoft Windows.

Game Modes

Classic Mode
This mode is played exactly like the original board game. Players take turns moving their pieces around the Trivial Pursuit board answering questions in six different categories to win one differently colored "pie piece" in each category. The first player to collect all six "pie pieces" and answer a randomly selected question in the game board's hub is the winner.

Unhinged
The titular Unhinged mode is a variation of Classic mode where players can bet on their opponents' game performance and certain spaces on the game board are given different properties including:

 Teleport - allows a player to move their playing piece anywhere on the board
 50/50 - removes two incorrect answers from your four multiple choice answers
 Rotate - spins the board and moves all players to new positions
 Recycle - allows the player to swap their initial trivia question

Flash
This is a quick two-player mode in which each player starts at the bottom of a tower and chooses a question in one of two random categories, each correct answer brings the player up a tier on the tower. The first player to the top is declared the winner.

Development
Atari announced the game on August 15, 2003 for a release during the Christmas season. However, the game would miss this release window, and was instead released in March 2004. A European release was announced for a March 2004 release in November 2003,
but this was delayed until October, with the Xbox version eventually being canceled in Europe.

References

External links
Official Trivial Pursuit: Unhinged webpage at trivialpursuit.com

2004 video games
Windows games
PlayStation 2 games
RenderWare games
Trivia
Video games based on board games
Video games developed in Canada
Xbox games
Artech Studios games
Multiplayer and single-player video games
Atari games